Leland Stanford Morgan (aka Le Morgan; 9 June 1886 San Francisco – 12 August 1981 Oakland, California) was an American commercial artist. He began in 1910 in San Francisco and eventually moved across the bay to Oakland where he remained for the rest of his life.  Morgan is known for his illustrations of sheet music covers by publishers mostly in the San Francisco Bay area.

Career 
At age 17, Morgan graduated from the California Business College in San Francisco in December 1903.  In 1930, Morgan began teaching Fashion Art and Commercial Art at the Fox Art Institute and School of Commercial Art, founded in 1921 in Oakland by Elton Villers Frederick Fox (1893–1970). In 1930, when he began teaching there, they renamed it the Fox-Morgan Art Institute and Commercial Art School. Fox returned to his native home in Victoria, Australia, in 1935, and Ruel Curtis Dean became associated with the school for two years. In 1937, the school was renamed Art Institute on the 3rd floor at 339 15th Street, Oakland, and Morgan became its head.  Notable alumni of the Fox-Morgan School include Dong Kingman.

Selected sheet music covers 
Jerome H. Remick & Co., Detroit, New York

 "The Rah-Rah Boy" (1908 & 1911); 
 Music by Wallie Herzer, arranged by Eugene Brown
 Cover: caricature of a male college student smoking a pipe with bulldog; "Rah-rah boy" was a reference to a college male. The class of '09 is illustrated on his pipe and sweater. One of the colors, blue, the bulldog, and the scull and bones insignia — taken as a composite — fits a profile of a Yale student. (view, courtesy of the Indiana University Bloomington)

 "Everybody Two-Step" (1911); 
 By Wallie Herzer
 Cover: caricature of a jolly minstrel or busker banjoist with one or two missing teeth, seated in morning dress: single-breasted black frock coat with notched red-trimmed lapels, red, white, and black-striped top collar, red-trimmed sleeves, lined with single white French-cuffs; white vest; black-and-white checkered bow-tie with matching black-and-white checkered trousers trimmed with white gaiters; gemstone centered on upper shirt- or vest-front below the bow tie; black cap-toe dress shoes with white-stitched welts, topped with red, white, and black striped spats that match the top collar; top hat with red patterned hat band on ground, brim up, casting a shadow; red background, black lettering, white base — signature by Morgan indicates 1910 (view, courtesy of York University, Toronto) (2nd view, courtesy of Mississippi State University)

Frederick V. Bowers Music Publishers, Inc., New York

 "Kuu Loke Ula Ula, (My Red Red Rose)" (1917); 
 Composed by Frederick V. Bowers (1874–1961), lyrics by Jesse G. M. Glick (né Jesse Grant Monroe Glick; 1874–1939), (view, courtesy of Gonzaga University)

Buell Music, San Francisco

 "She Sang Aloha to Me" (1915); 
 Lyrics & music by Joseph Buell Carey (view, courtesy of Mississippi State University)

 "Sierra Sue", a song of the hills (1916); 
 Words & music by Joseph Buell Carey (view, courtesy of Gonzaga University)

 "Bonnie Bell", three step (1916); 
 Words & music by Joseph Buell Carey (view, courtesy of Gonzaga University)

 "Smile a Little Smile For Me" (1917); 
 Words & music by Joseph Buell Carey
 Patriotic World War I song

 "In My Little Lovemobile" (1917); 
 Lyrics & music by Joseph Buell Carey (view, courtesy of The Authentic History Center, Michael Barnes, Ada, Michigan) (2nd view, courtesy of Mississippi State University)

 "Sweet Is the Night, My Lady", Hawaiian serenade (1917); 

 "Antonio, My Boy" (1918); 
 Words & music by Joseph Beull Carey (view, courtesy of the Indiana University Bloomington)

McKiernan Publishing, San Jose, California

 "Good-Bye Good Luck Old Hawaii" (1916); 

Sherman, Clay & Co., San Francisco

 "Fair Hawaii" (1913); 
 Lyrics & music James Fulton Kutz (view, courtesy of the Hawaiian Historical Society, Honolulu)

 "My Waikiki Ukulele Girl" (1916); 
 Lyrics Jesse G. M. Glick (né Jesse Grant Monroe Glick; 1874–1939), music by Chris Smith

M. Witmark & Sons, New York

 "My Honolulu Honey Lou" (1911); 

Harry L. Newman, Grand Opera House, Chicago

 "I Want To Meet That Man" ("Who Wrote That Melody") (1913)
 Lyrics & music by Will Morrissey & Bert Hanlon (né Adolph Bert Handelsman; 1890–1972) (view, courtesy of Mississippi State University)

Lorden Music, San Francisco

 "The Island of Cuddle and Squeeze" (1914); 

Nat. Goldstein Music Pub. Co., San Francisco

 "A Little Farther" (1914); 
 Lyrics by Maurice J. Gunsky (1887–1945), music by Nathan Goldstein (1887–1956)
 Cover: illustration of a man and woman in a car under the full moon  (view, courtesy of Mississippi State University)

Art Hickman, San Francisco

 "Rose Room Fox Trot", song without words (1917); 
 By Art Hickman (né Arthur George Hickman; 1886–1930) (Art was a pianist from San Francisco)

Daniels & Wilson, music publishers, San Francisco

 "Dreamy Moon" (1917); 
 Lyrics by Sidney Carter, music by Walter Smith (1885–1968)

 "Bad Bad Baby" (1917) 
 Lyrics by Raymond Egan, music by Howard Patrick (view, courtesy of Mississippi State University)

 "Sweet Daddy" (1917); 
 Lyrics & music by Howard Patrick

 "Down in Hindustan": song of the East (1917); 
 Lyrics by Raymond B. Egan, music by Walter Smith (1885–1968) (view, courtesy of the Indiana University Bloomington)

 "Oriental" ("Some Day in Araby"), fox trot (1918); 
 Lyrics by Richard Coburn (né Frank Reginald DeLong; 1886–1952), music by Vincent Rose (view, courtesy of )

 "My Sweet Virginia Rose" (1918); 
 Lyrics & music by Walter Smith (1885–1968)

F.G. Rempe, Oakland, California

 "Lovely Hawaiian Moon" (1917); 
 Lyrics & music by Frank George Rempe (1891–1959)

J.G. Dewey, San Francisco

 "Over The Top, The Top, We Go" (1918); 
 By James G. Dewey (né James Godfrey Patrick Dewey; 1878–1964) (view, courtesy of Brown University)

J.A. MacMeekin, New York

 "Hawaiian Breezes" (1920); 
 Lyrics by Cyril John MacMeekin (1896–1991), music by John Alfred MacMeeken (1874–1960) – John was Cyril's father (view, courtesy of the Hawaiian Historical Society)

Family 
Spouse
 Morgan married Ruth Vivian Holloway and had two children, Alan Edgar Morgan, (April 1, 1922 to December 26, 2015), an architect based in the San Francisco Bay area, and Merele Marcella Morgan (1919–2004) who married John Benton Saunders (1917–2010).

References 

1886 births
1981 deaths
Sheet music cover artists
American illustrators
Art Nouveau illustrators
Artists from the San Francisco Bay Area
Artists from Oakland, California
People from San Francisco
People from Oakland, California